Heterocithara is a genus of sea snails, marine gastropod mollusks in the family Mangeliidae.

Description
The small shell is biconical and solid. It contains numerous perpendicular riblets extending from the suture to the base These are overrun by smaller spiral cords, between which are dense microscopic hairlines. No fasciole The varix is larger than the ribs The  sinus is small. Within the  outer lip are a series of denticules.

Distribution
This marine genus occurs off Indonesia and Australia (New South Wales, Queensland, Victoria)

Fossils have been found in Australian Tertiary strata, in Miocene strata in New Zealand and Quaternary strata in China.

Species
Species within the genus Heterocithara include:
 Heterocithara bilineata (Angas, 1871)
 Heterocithara concinna Hedley, 1922
 Heterocithara erismata Hedley, 1922
 † Heterocithara granolirata (Powell, 1944)
 Heterocithara himerta (Melvill & Standen, 1896)
 Heterocithara hirsuta (De Folin, 1867)
 † Heterocithara laterculus Marwick, 1931 
 † Heterocithara marwicki Maxwell, 1988 
 Heterocithara mediocris Odhner, 1924
 Heterocithara rigorata (Hedley, 1909)
 Heterocithara seriliola Hedley, 1922
 Heterocithara sibogae Shuto, 1970
 Heterocithara transenna Hedley, 1922
 Heterocithara tribulationis (Hedley, 1909)
 Heterocithara zebuensis (Reeve, 1846)

References

External links
  Bouchet P., Kantor Yu.I., Sysoev A. & Puillandre N. (2011) A new operational classification of the Conoidea. Journal of Molluscan Studies 77: 273-308
 Worldwide Mollusc Species Data Base: Mangeliidae
  Tucker, J.K. 2004 Catalog of recent and fossil turrids (Mollusca: Gastropoda). Zootaxa 682:1-1295.

 
Gastropod genera